The Chaco Basin (or ) is a major sedimentary basin in Central South America around the borders of Argentina, Bolivia and Paraguay. The basin forms part of the larger Paraná Basin. Superficially, the Chaco Basin is an alluvial basin composed of land-derived (in contrast to marine sediments) material, mostly fine sand and clays of Paleogene, Neogene and Quaternary age. On deeper levels the Paraguayan Chaco is made up by four sub-basins, the Pirizal, Pilar, Carandaity and Curupaity basins.

Stratigraphy 
The basin is part of the megaregional Paraná Basin, of which it occupies its western portion. The basin is subdivided into the Western Chaco (Chaco Occidental) and Eastern Chaco (Chaco Oriental). The Paleozoic stratigraphy of the Chaco Basin comprises the Middle to Late Carboniferous Sachayoj Formation, the Late Carboniferous Charata Formation and the Early Permian Chacabuco Formation. The Neogene cover contains the Late Miocene Paraná Formation, the Late Pleistocene (Lujanian in the SALMA classification) Chaco Formation, also described as Eocene to Miocene, and the substratum-forming Fortín Tres Pozos Formation in the Formosa Province of northern Argentina.

References

Bibliography 
 
 
 
  
 

Sedimentary basins of Argentina
Sedimentary basins of Bolivia
Sedimentary basins of Paraguay
Foreland basins

Geology of Santa Cruz Department (Bolivia)
Geology of Tarija Department